Real Men... Wear Black is a studio album by the funk group Cameo released in 1990 on Atlanta Artists/Mercury Records. The album reached No. 18 on the Billboard Top Soul Albums chart.

Critical reception

Jon Pareles of the New York Times stated that "Larry Blackmon's cracked nasal voice keeps the band funny and unpretentious, especially when kicking up its well honed midtempo funk". Allmusic gave the album a three out of five star rating. Chris Heim of the Chicago Tribune noted that Real Men is another solid example of Cameo`s approach to the sound" of "black rock." Don Waller of the Los Angeles Times also proclaimed "using a krazee-quilt combination of synthetic/organic keyboards ‘n’ hipshot! percussion, greazy basslines and goofbawl vocals, (heavy on the minor sevenths), Cameo rolls back the rug for a wall-to-off-the-wall dance party".

Singles
I Want It Now reached No. 5 on the Billboard Hot R&B Songs chart. Close Quarters also reached No. 38 on the Billboard Hot R&B Songs chart.

Track listing

Personnel
Backing Vocals – Charlie Singleton, Larry Blackmon, Nathan Leftenant, Tomi Jenkins, Willie Morris
Bass – Aaron Mills
Design – Reiner Design Consultants, Inc.
Drums, Percussion – Larry Blackmon
Engineer [Assistant] – Milton Chan, Paul Speck
Engineer [Mixing] – Barney Perkins
Engineer [Recording] – Barney Perkins, Christopher Rutherford
Guitar – Charlie Singleton
Keyboards – Charlie Singleton, Kevin Kendricks, Robert Smith, Billy Allen
Lead Vocals – Larry Blackmon, Tomi Jenkins, Willie Morris
Photography By – David Vance 
Producer – Larry Blackmon
Programmed By – Kevin Kendricks, Robert Smith, Billy Allen
Saxophone – Melvin Wells
Scratches – Smoove & Konduko
Trombone – Jeryl Bright
Trumpet – Nathan Leftenant

Charts

References

Cameo (band) albums
1990 albums
Mercury Records albums